In the context of China, the term prefecture is used to refer to several unrelated political divisions in both ancient and modern China. 

In modern China, a prefecture is formally a kind of prefecture-level division. There are 339 prefecture-level divisions in China. These include 7 prefectures, 299 prefecture-level cities, 30 autonomous prefectures and 3 leagues. Other than provincial level divisions, prefectural level divisions are not mentioned in the Chinese constitution.

Types of prefectural level divisions

Prefecture
Prefectures are administrative subdivisions of provincial-level divisions.

The administrative commission is an administrative branch office with the rank of a national ministerial department and dispatched by the higher-level provincial government. The leader of the prefecture government, titled as prefectural administrative commissioner, is appointed by the provincial government. Instead of local people's congresses, the prefecture's working commission of the standing committee of the provincial people's congress is dispatched and supervises the prefecture governments, but can not elect or dismiss prefecture governments. The prefecture's working committee of the provincial committee of the Chinese People's Political Consultative Conference (CPCC) is a part of the prefecture's committee of the CPPCC. This means that the prefecture's working committee of the CPPCC is a branch of the provincial committee of the CPPCC, not an individual society entity. The same is valid for provincial CPPCCs, which are formally sections of the national CPPCC.

The term prefecture derives from the former circuit, which was a level between the provincial and the county level during the Qing dynasty. In 1928, the government of the Republic of China abolished the circuit level and the province administrated counties directly; however, this reform was soon found unfeasible because some provinces had hundreds of counties. Consequently, in 1932, provinces were again subdivided into several prefectures, and regional administrative offices were set up.

At one point, prefectures were the most common type of prefecture-level division. Today they have been mostly converted into prefecture-level cities, and the trend is still ongoing, with only seven prefectures remaining in China.

Prefecture-level city

Prefecture-level cities are municipalities that are given prefecture status and the right to govern surrounding counties. In practice, prefecture-level cities are so large that they are just like any other prefectures (prefecture-level administrative divisions), and not cities in the traditional sense of the word at all.

Prefecture-level cities are the most common type of prefecture-level division in mainland China today.

League

Leagues are the prefectures of Inner Mongolia. The name comes from a kind of ancient Mongolian administrative unit used during the Qing dynasty in Mongolia. To preempt any sense of Mongolian unity or solidarity, the Qing dynasty executed divide and rule policies in which Mongolian banners (county-level regions) were separated from each other. Leagues had no true ruler-ship, they only had conventional assemblies consisting of banners. During the ROC era, the leagues had a status equivalent to provinces. Leagues contain banners, equivalent to counties.

After the establishment of the provincial-level Inner Mongolia Autonomous Region in 1947, the leagues of Inner Mongolia became equal to prefectures in other provinces and autonomous regions. The governments of the league, xíngzhènggōngshǔ, are the administrative branch offices dispatched by the People's Government of the Inner Mongolia Autonomous Region. The leader of the league's government, titled as league leader, is appointed by the People's Government of the Inner Mongolia Autonomous Region. So are deputy leaders of leagues. Instead of a local-level people's congress, a league's working commissions of the Standing Committee of the People's Congress of the Inner Mongolia Autonomous Region are detached and supervise the league's governments, but can not elect or dismiss league's government officials. In such a way, the league's working committee of the Inner Mongolia Autonomous Region's committee of the Chinese People's Political Consultative Conference is instead the league's committee of the CPPCC.

Similar to prefectures, most leagues have been replaced by prefecture-level cities. There are only three leagues remaining in Inner Mongolia.

Autonomous prefecture

Autonomous prefectures either have over 50% of the population with ethnic minorities or are historically resided by significant minorities. All autonomous prefectures are mostly dominated, in population, by the Han Chinese. The official name of an autonomous prefecture includes the most dominant minority in that region, sometimes two, rarely three. For example, a Kazakh (Kazak in official naming system) prefecture may be called Kazak Zizhizhou.

Like all other prefecture-level divisions, autonomous prefectures are divided into county-level divisions. There is one exception: Ili Kazak Autonomous Prefecture contains two prefectures of its own.

Under the constitution of the People's Republic of China, autonomous prefectures cannot be abolished. However, two autonomous prefecture were dissolved when new provinces were established such as Hainan Li and Miao Autonomous Prefecture when Hainan Province was established in 1988 and Qianjiang Tujia and Miao Autonomous Prefecture when Chongqing Municipality was established in 1997.

Development zone
Development zones were temporary prefectural level divisions. Chongqing was a development zone before it became a municipality, and two development zones were set up within Chongqing immediately after it became a municipality. These divisions were temporary and no longer exist.

 Qianjiang Migration Development Area – formerly Qianjiang Prefecture
 Wanxian Migration Development Area – formerly Wanxian City (prefecture-level)

Legal status
The constitution of the People's Republic of China does not endorse any prefectural level division, except for autonomous prefectures. Prefectures and leagues are not at all mentioned; provinces are explicitly stated to be divided directly into counties.

The constitution does not explicitly endorse the existence of prefecture-level cities, but it does mention that "comparatively large cities" are divided into counties and districts. However, there are only 49 prefectural level cities that have been designated as "comparatively large". As a result, the vast majority of prefecture-level cities do not have the constitutional basis for governing districts and counties.

The wholesale conversion of prefectures into prefectural level cities has resulted in the phenomenon of "cities containing cities"—prefectural level cities containing county level cities. There is no legal basis for this, not even for the 49 "comparatively large cities". Thus, the county-level cities technically do not "belong" to the prefecture-level city, but are instead "governed on behalf" (代管) of the province by the prefectural level city, though in practice the county level cities do indeed belong to their governing prefectural level cities.

Ancient sense
In the history of the political divisions of China, the word "prefecture" has been applied onto three unrelated types of division: the xian, the zhou and the fu. In general the word "prefecture" is applied to xian for the period before the Sui and Tang dynasties; for the period after, xian are called "districts" or "counties", while "prefectures" now refer to zhou and fu.

XianXian (/) were first established during the Warring States period, and have existed continuously ever since. Today, they continue to form an important part of the political divisions of China.Xian has been translated using several English language terms. In the context of ancient history, "district" and "prefecture" are the most commonly used terms, while "county" is generally used for more contemporary contexts.

ZhouZhou were first established during the Han dynasty, and were abolished only with the establishment of the Republic of China.Zhou is generally translated as "province" or "region" for the period before the Sui dynasty, and "prefecture" for the period from the Sui dynasty onwards.

The People's Republic of China has revived the word zhou as part of the term "zizhizhou", which is translated as "autonomous prefectures", as described above.

FuFu were first established during the Tang dynasty, and were also abolished with the establishment of the Republic of China.

During the Tang and Song dynasties, the term was mainly applied to prefectures with major urban centers. For this period, it is often translated as "urban prefecture" or "superior prefecture". Later, however, most first-level prefectures under provinces would become known as fu''.

See also
 Administrative divisions of China
 List of prefectures in China
 Prefecture-level city

References

 
Administrative divisions of China
China
Prefectures, China